Silenus or Sileni may refer to:

Mythology
Silenus, a satyr and companion to Dionysus
The plural sileni may refer to the mythological figure as a type that is sometimes thought to be differentiated from a satyr
Satyr, also known as a silenos, a male nature spirit

Biology
A butterfly, Myrina silenus
A damselfly, Drepanosticta silenus
The lion-tailed macaque, Macaca silenus
The prowfish, Zaprora silenus

People
Silenus Calatinus, a 2nd century BC Sicilian Greek historian

Other
Šílení (Lunacy), a 2005 Czech film